Edward Charles Elliott (1904–1979) was a twice British Champion flat racing jockey.

He was still an apprentice to John L Jarvis when he won his first jockey's title (which he shared with Steve Donoghue) in 1923. He won again the following year, with a total of 106 winners.  After this, he spent a large part of his riding career in France, riding for Marcel Boussac, for whom he also won the 1935 Middle Park Stakes on Abjer. He would return to France after he finished riding in 1953 to train for him as well.

In the post-war period he rode for George Colling. When Colling was unable to train due to illness, he prepared Nimbus to go and win the 1949 2,000 Guineas and Derby. His took up full-time training with Boussac, but after that finished in 1958, he also spent five years training at Machell House, Newmarket before retiring in 1963.

In 1999, the Racing Post ranked Elliott as sixth in their list of the Top 50 jockeys of the 20th century.

In total, he won fourteen British Classic Races.

Major wins
 Great Britain

Classics
 1,000 Guineas – (4) - Plack (1924), Four Course (1931), Kandy (1932), Picture Play (1944)
 2,000 Guineas – (5) - Ellangowan (1923), Flamingo (1928), Djebel 1940, Lambert Simnel (1941), Nimbus (1949)
 Derby – (3) - Call Boy (1927), Bois Roussel (1938), Nimbus (1949)
 Oaks – (2) - Brulette (1931), Why Hurry (1943)

Selected other races
 Ascot Gold Cup – Golden Myth (1922) 
 Eclipse Stakes – Golden Myth (1922)
 King's Stand Stakes – Gold Bridge (1934)
 Nunthorpe Stakes - Gold Bridge (1934)

References

1904 births
1979 deaths
British jockeys
British Champion flat jockeys
British Champion apprentice jockeys